The Savoy Region Movement is a French regionalist political party based in Savoy.

The party supports the creation of a Savoyard region composed of the departments of Savoie and Haute-Savoie. Both of these departments are part of the larger Rhône-Alpes region, an 'artificial' region built in 1972. It also supports Arpitan (or Franco-Provençal), the older language of this region.

The party is a member of the Fédération Régions et Peuples Solidaires and the European Free Alliance, and it has had only one of its members elected to the regional council since 1992.

References

External links
Official Site

History of Savoy
European Free Alliance
Regionalist parties in France
Political parties established in 1972